Neutron irradiation damage refers to material changes caused by high neutron flux, typically in a nuclear reactor after many years.

Graphite may shrink and then swell.

See also 
 Neutron embrittlement
 Neutron radiation#Effects on materials

References 

Neutron
Materials degradation